The 2021 Judo World Masters was held in Doha, Qatar, from 11 to 13 January 2021.

Medal summary

Medal table
Source

Men's events
Source

Women's events
Source

Prize money
The sums written are per medalist, and with the two additional best male and female judoka of 2,000€ each, bring the total prizes awarded to 200,000€.

References

External links
 

World Masters
IJF World Masters
World Masters
Judo World Masters
Judo World Masters